Matveyevo is a rural locality (a village) in Kemskoye Rural Settlement, Vytegorsky District, Vologda Oblast, Russia. The population was 3 as of 2002.

Geography 
Matveyevo is located 100 km southeast of Vytegra (the district's administrative centre) by road. Yelinskaya is the nearest rural locality.

References 

Rural localities in Vytegorsky District